Van Zandt Williams (1916–1966) was president of the Optical Society of America in 1966.  He was the Director of the American Institute of Physics in 1965.

See also 

 List of OSA presidents

References

External links 
 Articles Published by early OSA Presidents Journal of the Optical Society of America 
 Van Zandt Williams 1916–1966 Journal of the Optical Society of America

Presidents of Optica (society)
20th-century American physicists
1916 births
1966 deaths